Ludwig Paul Koch MBE (13 November 1881, Frankfurt am Main – 4 May 1974, Harrow, London) was a broadcaster and sound recordist. An expert on recording animal sounds, he played a significant part in increasing the British public's appreciation of wildlife.

Biographical details 
Koch was born into a music-loving Jewish family as Paul Ludwig
, and as a boy violinist, he was admitted to Clara Schumann's music circle. Later, he studied singing, and had a short but successful career as a concert singer. This was ended by the outbreak of World War I. As a child, he had been given an early phonograph and had recorded several animals, including the first-known recording of bird song, made in 1889.

Because he spoke fluent French, he joined military intelligence. After the Armistice in 1918, he became chief delegate for repatriation for the French-occupied zone of Germany. He worked for the German government until 1925. In 1928, he was commissioned by the German subsidiary of Electric and Musical Industries (EMI) to start a cultural branch of the gramophone industry; this coincided with a revival of his childhood interest in animals. Thus from 1929, he began recording of animal sounds again using up-to-date equipment. He invented the sound-book: attaching gramophone records to an illustrated book. Nowadays we call this multimedia.

In January 1936, Koch went on a lecture tour in Switzerland. His return flight ticket was given to him by Hermann Göring, who, as a bird and animal lover, was a fan of Koch's work. After Koch's last lecture, he was approached by a man who told him he was the Third Reich's representative in Switzerland and that he had followed Koch's lectures and written a very good report about them. It turned out the man was Wilhelm Gustloff and he was assassinated the following day. Since Koch had been seen speaking to Gustloff just hours beforehand, he became concerned about his return to Germany, that he would be accused of being involved in the assassination. He called the director of his recording company, a Nazi, who told him, "Just stay where you are. The air in Switzerland is much better than in Germany." Koch then fled to Great Britain. Sir Julian Huxley helped him to interest the ornithologist and publisher Harry Witherby in a sound-book of British wild birds.  In 1936, Songs of Wild Birds was published, followed by two other sound-books by 1938 (More Songs of Wild Birds in 1937 & Animal Language in 1938). In 1937 he made recordings of the birds in the park of the royal castle in La(e)ken (Belgium) with the aid of queen Elisabeth of Belgium. These recordings were published only in 1952, due to the circumstances of war and the Belgian Royal Question.

Early in World War II, Huxley introduced Koch to the British Broadcasting Corporation, and his distinctive, yet attractive and rather musical, voice accompanying his sound recordings soon became familiar to listeners. His sound recordings were acquired by the BBC and established the BBC's library of natural history sound. He never lost his strong German accent. His work was parodied by Peter Sellers. Koch retired in 1951, but continued to make expeditions to record wildlife sounds, visiting Iceland when he was seventy-one. He was the subject of a 2009 BBC Radio 4 documentary presented by Sean Street, "Ludwig Koch and the Music of Nature". His recordings and manuscript papers are preserved in the British Library Sound Archive.

In literature 
Koch's visit to Epping Forest to record badgers is described in A Forest by Night, by Fred Speakman.

Discography 
 Der Wald Erschallt (Verlag Knorr & Hirth, 1934)
 Im gleichen Schritt und Tritt (Verlag Knorr & Hirth, 1934)
 Stolz weht die Flagge (Verlag Knorr & Hirth, 1934)
 Gefiederte Meistersänger - 1st edition (Brühlscher Verlag Giessen, 1935)
 Songs of Wild Birds (H.F. & G. Witherby, 1936)
 More Songs of Wild Birds (H.F. & G. Witherby, 1937)
 Hunting by Ear - 1st edition (H.F. & G. Witherby, 1937)
 Animal Language (Country Life / Parlophone, 1938)
 Les Oiseaux Chanteurs de Laeken (Parlophone, 1952)
 Songs of British Birds (HMV, 1953)
 Ludwig Koch Remembers: 1 (BBC, 1957)
 Ludwig Koch Remembers: 2 (BBC, 1957)
 Hunting by Ear - 2nd edition (H.F. & G. Witherby, 1960)

References 

Dictionary of National Biography
 L. Koch, Memoirs of a Birdman (1955)
 J. Burton, ‘Master of nature's music: Ludwig Koch, 1881–1974’, Country Life, 157 (1975), 390–91
 J. F. Burton, ‘Our debt to Ludwig Koch: master of nature's music’, Recorded Sound, 74–5 (1979), 36–7
 C. Tipp, 'With an Ear to the Earth', Slightly Foxed, No. 43, Autumn 2014
 The Times obituary, 7 May 1974
 F. J. Speakman, A Forest by Night (1965), 45-51

External links 
 Wildlife recordings of Ludwig Koch - streamed audio from The British Library
 Wild Film History: Ludwig Koch - biography and photographs
 Ludwig Koch and the Music of Nature - BBC radio documentary
 Gefiederte Meistersänger (Feathered Mastersingers) 1935 - review of soundbook, published on The Field Reporter
 Animal Language - British Library Sound and Vision blog
 In Times of War - British Library Sound And Vision blog
 To a Skylark - British Library Sound and Vision blog
 https://www.academia.edu/21184874/La_e_ken_Revisited (Dutch, on the re-publishing of the songbirds of Laeken)
https://laca.stackstorage.com/s/NJBzfLGfsiaITer : Laeken re-revisited (Dutch), 12 years after the former article
 Ludwig Koch at the National Portrait Gallery

1881 births
1974 deaths
German ornithologists
Jewish emigrants from Nazi Germany to the United Kingdom
Wildlife sound recordists
20th-century German zoologists